The Walter Boas Medal is awarded by the Australian Institute of Physics for research in Physics in Australia. It is named in memory of is named in memory of Walter Boas (1904-1982) — an eminent scientist and metallurgist who worked on the physics of metals.

Recipients 
Source: Australian Institute of Physics
 1984 James A. Piper, Macquarie University (inaugural winner)
 1985 Peter Hannaford, CSIRO Division of Materials Technology 
 1986 Donald Melrose, Sydney University 
 1987 Anthony William Thomas, University of Adelaide 
 1988 Robert Delbourgo, University of Tasmania 
 1989 Jim Williams, University of Western Australia 
 1990 Geoff Opat, University of Melbourne 
 1990 Tony Klein, University of Melbourne 
 1991 Parameswaran Hariharan, CSIRO Division of Applied Physics 
 1992 Bruce Harold John McKellar, University of Melbourne 
 1993 Jim Williams, Australian National University 
 1994 No medal awarded 
 1995 David Blair, University of Western Australia 
 1996 Andris Stelbovics, Murdoch University 
 1996 Igor Bray, Flinders University 
 1997 Keith Nugent, University of Melbourne 
 1997 Stephen W. Wilkins, CSIRO 
 1998 Robert Clark, University of NSW 
 1999 No medal awarded 
 2000 Hans A. Bachor, Australian National University 
 2001 Tony Williams, University of Adelaide 
 2002 Peter Robinson, University of Sydney 
 2003 Gerard J. Milburn, University of Queensland 
 2004 George Dracoulis, Australian National University 
 2005 Yuri Kivshar, Australian National University 
 2006 Michael Edmund Tobar, The University of Western Australia 
 2007 Derek Leinweber, University of Adelaide 
 2008 Peter Drummond, Swinburne University of Technology 
 2009 Victor Flambaum, University of New South Wales 
 2010 Kostya Ostrikov, CSIRO 
 2011 Ben Eggleton, University of Sydney
 2012 Lloyd Hollenberg, University of Melbourne
 2013 Chennupati Jagadish, Australian National University
 2014 Stuart Wyithe, University of Melbourne
 2015 Min Gu,  Swinburne University of Technology
 2016 Geraint F. Lewis, University of Sydney
 2017 David McClelland, Australian National University
 2018 Elisabetta Barberio, University of Melbourne
 2019 Andrea Morello, University of NSW
 2020 Joss Bland-Hawthorn, University of Sydney
 2021 Howard Wiseman, Griffith University

See also

 List of physics awards
 List of prizes named after people

References

Australian science and technology awards
Physics awards
Awards established in 1984